Two ships of the United States Navy have been named Circe, after Circe, the sorceress in Homer's Odyssey.

  only carried that name from 15 June to 10 August 1869 and was previously the Marietta.
  was launched on 4 August 1944 by the Walsh-Kaiser Company in Providence, Rhode Island.

Sources
 

United States Navy ship names